Texas fever is a disease caused by infection with Babesia.

Texas fever may also refer to:

 Texas Fever, an album by Orange Juice
 Texas Fever (novel), a novel by Donald Hamilton